General Purna Chandra Thapa (born 9 September 1960) was the Chief of Army Staff in the Nepalese Army until 2021. He served as the Head of Mission and Force Commander of the United Nations Disengagement Observer Force from 19 January 2015 until 7 February 2016.

Thapa's tenure as COAS of Nepal Army was characterised by many important structural changes. Thapa vowed to get rid of corruption, nepotism and other unlawful activities in the army. Due to corruption allegations against former Chief Rajendra Chhetri, Thapa even went ahead and made all his property details public in order to demonstrate his anti-corruption stance. Thapa also promised to provide equal opportunities to everyone serving in the army, and has been an advocate for digitalisation of Nepal Army.

With his retirement on September 08, 2021; here with comes to a legacy of 18th Generation of Continuous Service by General Purna Chandra Thapa's family.

Biography
He was educated at the University of Madras in India and Tribhuvan University in Nepal and holds a Master of Philosophy degree. In addition, he pursued additional studies at the Army Command and Staff College of Nepal.

He was promoted to the rank of Lt General on 4 October 2015. Thapa has held various high-level positions in the Nepalese Army and has worked with the Nepalese contingent to the United Nations Interim Force in Lebanon. In a WikiLeaks document dated 13 April 2006, Colonel Purna Chandra Thapa is mentioned as "Deputy Chief of Staff for Operations". As a brigadier general, he served as Director of Welfare Planning. Thapa was the Adjutant General,  before being appointed commander of the Valley Division in 2012. Prior to his United Nations appointment on 19 January 2015 by Secretary-General Ban Ki-moon, Lt General Thapa served as the Master General of Ordinance with the Nepalese Army. On 9 September 2018, he assumed the office of Chief of Army Staff of Nepal Army.

References

Nepalese officials of the United Nations
Nepalese generals
University of Madras alumni
Tribhuvan University alumni
People from Lamjung District
Living people
1960 births
National Defence College, India alumni